Beauty Queen is a Philippine television drama series broadcast by GMA Network. Directed by Joel Lamangan, it stars Iza Calzado in the title role. It premiered on October 18, 2010 on the network's Telebabad line up replacing Endless Love. The series concluded on February 4, 2011 with a total of 80 episodes. It was replaced by I Heart You, Pare! in its timeslot.

Cast and characters

Lead cast
 Iza Calzado as Maita San Miguel

Supporting cast
 Katrina Halili as Dorcas Rivas
 Maggie Wilson as Rebecca Rivas
 TJ Trinidad as Marc Sandoval
 Marvin Agustin as Donald Cervantes
 Luis Alandy as Dante Pineda
 Elizabeth Oropesa as Amparo Matias-San Miguel
 Carmi Martin as Leavida Acuesta-Rivas
 Gloria Diaz as Yuri Sandoval
 German Moreno as Ading
 Juan Rodrigo as Virgilio Rivas
 Bubbles Paraiso as Stefania Luna
 Bembol Roco as Anya / Angelo Castillo
 Marky Lopez as Clifford Almar
 Victor Aliwalas as Greg Almario
 Tomas Gonzales as Zuleyka Mamaril
 Lou Sison as Yeda Marie
 Ricci Chan as Larry / Lara
 Arci Muñoz as Kaye Santos

Guest cast
 Lovi Poe as young Amparo
 Iwa Moto as young Leavida
 Daniella Amable as young Maita
 Gianna Cutler as young Rebecca
 Angelene Perez as young Dorcas
 Jay Aquitania as young Anya
 James Blanco as young Virgilio
 Jerould Aceron as young Dante
 Miggs Cuaderno as young Larry
 Gerard Madrid as Mando San Miguel
 Daria Ramirez as Amparo's mother
 Jan Marini Alano
 Chariz Solomon as Gracia
 Patani as Precious
 Tessbomb as Liza
 Ava Roxas as April
 Janna Dominguez as Amor
 Say Alonzo as Ayra
 Elyn Garsha as Mira
 Marco Alcaraz as himself
 Precious Lara Quigaman as herself
 Will Devaughn as himself
 Pia Guanio as herself
 Jestoni Alarcon as himself
 Kuh Ledesma as herself 
 Yassi Pressman as Tina 
 Rich Asuncion as Binibi Isla Pilipinas
 Frederick Peralta as himself
 Evangeline Pascual as herself
 Geoff Eigenmann as himself

Ratings
According to AGB Nielsen Philippines' Mega Manila People/Individual television ratings, the pilot episode of Beauty Queen earned a 9.5% rating. While the final episode scored a 12.6% rating.

Accolades

References

External links
 

2010 Philippine television series debuts
2011 Philippine television series endings
Filipino-language television shows
GMA Network drama series
Television shows set in the Philippines